A quango or QUANGO (less often QuANGO or QANGO) is an organisation to which a government has devolved power, but which is still partly controlled and/or financed by government bodies. The term was originally a shortening of "quasi autonomous NGO", where NGO is the acronym for a non-government organization.

In its pejorative use, it has been widely applied to public bodies of various kinds, and a variety of backronyms have been used to make the term consistent with this expanded use. The most popular have been "Quasi-autonomous national government organization" and "Quasi-autonomous non-government organization", often with the acronym modified to "qango" or "QANGO".

As its original name suggests, a quango is a hybrid form of organization, with elements of both NGOs and public sector bodies. The term is most often applied in the United Kingdom and, to a lesser degree, Australia, Canada, Ireland, New Zealand and other English-speaking countries.

In the UK, the term quango covers different "arm's-length" government bodies, including "non-departmental public bodies" (NDPBs), non-ministerial government departments, and executive agencies.

Use

Canada 

In Canada, quangos are referred to as 'Crown Corporations' or simply 'Crown corps'. As of May 2021 there were 45 Crown corps owned by the Canadian federal government, however many more are owned by each of the provincial governments. Notably electricity providers such as the 'Saskatchewan Power Corporation' a.k.a. SaskPower owned by the province of Saskatchewan and 'Manitoba Hydro-Electric Board' a.k.a. Manitoba Hydro owned by the province of Manitoba.

Saskatchewan 

Saskatchewan is notable for the ubiquity of provincial crown corps with most styled with the prefix Sask- followed by the primary service. The larger Saskatchewan Crown corps have their own Saskatchewan minister with all Saskatchewan Crown corps owned by the Crown Investment Corporation of Saskatchewan which in turn is owned by the provincial government. Some of the most notable Saskatchewan Crown corps are as follows:
 SaskTel (Saskatchewan Telecommunications Holding Corporation) providing telecommunications. Notable for the last remaining government owned incumbent telephone provider in Canada.
 SaskPower (Saskatchewan Power Corporation) providing electricity.
 SaskEnergy (SaskEnergy Incorporated) providing natural gas.
 SaskWater (Saskatchewan Water Corporation) providing potable water and sewage services to certain communities.

Ireland 

In 2006, there were 832 quangos in the Republic of Ireland – 482 at national and 350 at local level – with a total of 5,784 individual appointees and a combined annual budget of €13 billion.

The Irish majority party, Fine Gael, had promised to eliminate 145 quangos should they be the governing party in the 2016 election. Since coming to power they have reduced the overall number of quangos by 17. This reduction also included agencies which the former government had already planned to remove.

New Zealand 

In New Zealand, quangos are referred to as 'Crown Entities', with the shift occurring in the 1980s during a period of neoliberalisation of the state sector. In 1996, New Zealand there was an estimated 310 quangos, plus an addition 2690 that were school Board of Trustees (similar to the American model of boards of education). Other quangos from 1996 include: "...63 Crown Health Enterprises, 39 tertiary education institutions, 21 Business development boards and 9 Crown Research Institutes. But there were also 71 single crown entities with services ranging from regulatory (e.g. Accounting Standards Review Board, Takeovers Panel) to quasi-judicial (e.g. Police Complaints Authority, Race Relations Conciliator), to the arts (e.g. New Zealand Symphony Orchestra, NZ Film Commission), to social welfare (e.g. Housing Corporation of NZ) and to substantial enterprises (e.g. Auckland International Airport Ltd)."

By 2003, the number of quangos had increased to an estimated 400 (excluding Board of Trustees), with more than 3,000 people sitting on governance boards that were appointed by successive governments. This appointment of people to governance boards has been widely criticised by political parties and political commentators as a form of cronyism.

In 2010, there were 2,607 crown entities (including Board of Trustees) with annual expenditure of $32billion in 2009/2010.

United Kingdom 

Despite a 1979 'commitment' from the Conservative party to curb the growth of non-departmental bodies, their numbers grew rapidly throughout that party's time in power during the 1980s. One UK example is the Forestry Commission, which is a non-ministerial government department responsible for forestry in England.

The Cabinet Office 2009 report on non-departmental public bodies found that there were 766 NDPBs sponsored by the UK government.
The number had been falling:  there were 827 in 2007 and 790 in 2008. The number of NDPBs had fallen by over 10% since 1997. Staffing and expenditure of NDPBs had increased. They employed 111,000 people in 2009 and spent £46.5 billion, of which £38.4 billion was directly funded by the Government.

United States 

Use of the term quango is less common in the United States although many US bodies, including Government Sponsored Enterprises, operate in the same fashion. However, Paul Krugman has stated that the US Federal Reserve is, effectively, "what the British call a quango... Its complex structure divides power between the federal government and the private banks that are its members, and in effect gives substantial autonomy to a governing board of long-term appointees."

Other U.S.-based organizations that fit the original definition of quangos include the National Center for Missing and Exploited Children (NCMEC), the Federal National Mortgage Association (Fannie Mae) and the Federal Home Loan Mortgage Corporation (Freddie Mac).

On the broader definition now used in the United Kingdom, there are hundreds of federal agencies that might be classed as quangos.

Indonesia 
Indonesian Ulema Council is considered a quango for its status as an independent, mass organization-like public organization but supported and financed by the state while keeping its status as independent organization outside the Indonesian state organizational system in other side. As a quango, MUI is empowered to issue religious edicts (fatwas) comparable to state laws which are binding upon the Indonesian Muslim population and can exert influence upon state policies, politics, and the economy due to its status and prestige.

History 

The term "quasi non-governmental organisation" was created in 1967 by Alan Pifer of the US-based Carnegie Foundation, in an essay on the independence and accountability of public-funded bodies that are incorporated in the private sector. This essay got the attention of David Howell, a Conservative M.P. in Britain, who then organized an Anglo-American project with Pifer, to examine the pros and cons of such enterprises. The lengthy term was shortened to the acronym QUANGO (later lowercased quango) by a British participant to the joint project, Anthony Barker, during one of the conferences on the subject.

It describes an ostensibly non-governmental organisation performing governmental functions, often in receipt of funding or other support from government, By contrast, traditional NGOs mostly get their donations or funds from the public and other organisations that support their cause.

An essential feature of a quango in the original definition was that it should not be a formal part of the state structure. The term was then extended to apply to a range of organisations, such as executive agencies providing (from 1988) health, education and other services. Particularly in the UK, this occurred in a polemical atmosphere in which it was alleged that proliferation of such bodies was undesirable and should be reversed. In this context, the original acronym was often replaced by a backronym spelt out as "quasi-autonomous national government organisation, and often rendered as 'qango' This spawned the related acronym qualgo, a 'quasi-autonomous local government organisation'.

The less contentious term non-departmental public body (NDPB) is often employed to identify numerous organisations with devolved governmental responsibilities. Examples in the United Kingdom include those engaged in the regulation of various commercial and service sectors, such as the Water Services Regulation Authority.

The UK government's definition in 1997 of a non-departmental public body or quango was:

Criticisms 

The Times has accused quangos of bureaucratic waste and excess. In 2005, Dan Lewis, author of The Essential Guide to Quangos, claimed that the UK had 529 quangos, many of which were useless and duplicated the work of others.

The term has spawned the derivative quangocrat; the Taxpayers' Alliance faulted a majority of "quangocrats" for not making declarations of political activity.

See also 
 Penelope Lyttelton, Viscountess Cobham – nicknamed the "Quango Queen"
 Departments of the United Kingdom Government
 Government-organized non-governmental organization (GONGO)
 Government agency
 Independent agency
 New York state public-benefit corporations
 Off-budget enterprise
 Scottish public bodies
 Welsh Government sponsored body
 Non-departmental public body

References

External links 

 Read Before Burning: Arm's length government for a new administration – report by the Institute for Government about the quango landscape
 Civil Service – Government Departments and Accredited NDPBs
 Economic Research Council – online database of all UK quangos 1998–2006
 Richard Allen and Dimitar Radev, "Managing and Controlling Extrabudgetary Funds", OECD Journal of Budgeting, Vol. 6, No. 4, 2006
 Carsten Greve, Matthew Flinders, Sandra Van Thiel (1999), Quangos—What's in a Name? Defining Quangos from a Comparative Perspective, Governance 12 (2), 129–146 
 UK government site about the process of making public appointments
 Quango name 'source of ridicule', files from 1980 show

Government bodies
Political terminology
1967 neologisms